Principles of Economics is an introductory economics textbook by Harvard economics professor N. Gregory Mankiw. It was first published in 1997 and has nine editions as of 2020. The book was discussed before its publication for the large advance Mankiw received for it from its publisher Harcourt and has sold over a million copies over its lifetime, generating Mankiw at least $42 million. After criticism about the price from students Mankiw decided to donate the textbook royalties from his students to charity.

Principles of Economics is the standard textbook for American economics departments' introductory classes. The current publisher Cengage claims it is the "most popular economics textbook".

10 Principles 
The book introduces 10 principles of economics "that supposedly represent the heart of economic wisdom".

Peter Bofinger has criticized the book for creating the "impression that the economic principles explained correspond to a kind of economic consensus", which it denies.

References

External links 

 Eighth edition at the Internet Archive
10 Principles of Economics on Wikiversity

Economics textbooks
1997 non-fiction books